Outward Bound (OB) is an international network of outdoor education organizations that was founded in the United Kingdom by Lawrence Holt and Kurt Hahn in 1941. Today there are organizations, called schools, in over 35 countries which are attended by more than 150,000 people each year. Outward Bound International is a non-profit membership and licensing organisation for the international network of Outward Bound schools. The Outward Bound Trust is an educational charity established in 1946 to operate the schools in the United Kingdom. Separate organizations operate the schools in each of the other countries in which Outward Bound operates.

Outward Bound helped to shape the U.S. Peace Corps and numerous other outdoor adventure programs. Its aim is to foster the personal growth and social skills of participants by using challenging expeditions in the outdoors.

History
The first Outward Bound school was opened in Aberdyfi, Wales in 1941 by Lawrence Holt and Kurt Hahn with financial support from the Blue Funnel Line shipping company. The name Outward Bound was derived from the nautical term for a ship leaving safe harbour for the open sea. Outward Bound grew out of Hahn's work in the development of the Gordonstoun school and what is now known as the Duke of Edinburgh's Award. Outward Bound's founding mission was to improve the survival chances of young seamen after their ships were torpedoed in the mid-Atlantic.

James Martin Hogan served as warden for the first year of the school. This mission was established and then expanded by Capt. J. F. "Freddy" Fuller who took over the leadership of the Aberdyfi school in 1942 and served the Outward Bound movement as senior warden until 1971. Fuller had been seconded from the Blue Funnel Line following wartime experience during the Battle of the Atlantic of surviving two successive torpedo attacks and commanding an open lifeboat in the Atlantic Ocean for thirty-five days without losing a single member of the crew.

An educational charity, named The Outward Bound Trust, was established in 1946 to operate the school. A second school followed in England at Eskdale Green in 1950. The first Outward Bound program for women was held in 1951. During the next decade, several other schools opened around the United Kingdom. A school in Lumut, Malaysia opened in 1954, the first outside the United Kingdom. Outward Bound Australia was founded in 1956. The first Outward Bound USA course was run in 1961 for the Peace Corps, which it helped to shape. Outward Bound New Zealand was founded in 1962, Outward Bound Singapore established in 1967 and Outward Bound Hong Kong in 1970.

From the inception of Outward Bound, community service was an integral part of the program, especially in the areas of sea and mountain rescues and this remains an important part of the training for both staff and students. During the period 1941 to 1965 in the United Kingdom, the philosophy of the schools evolved from "character‐training" to "personal growth" and "self‐discovery". Aberdyfi remains the organisation's "nerve-centre" in the United Kingdom. Over the course of a summer in 2010, 7000 to 8,000 students attended courses at the Aberdyfi centre and more than a million young people have attended Outward Bound courses in the UK since 1941. Prince Philip served as the Patron of the Outward Bound Trust for several years before handing over to his son Prince Andrew, who resigned in November 2019.

Outward Bound International was founded as a non-profit organization in 2004 to license the use of the brand name "Outward Bound" and to provide support for the international network of schools. Today there are organizations, called schools, in more than 35 countries with 250 wilderness and urban locations around the world which are attended by more than 250,000 people each year. Separate organizations operate the schools in each of the other countries in which Outward Bound operates.

Blue Peter nautical flag

The name Outward Bound derives from a nautical expression that refers to the moment a ship leaves the harbour. This is signified by Outward Bound's use of the nautical flag, the Blue Peter (a white square inside a blue square). JF Fuller adapted the Outward Bound motto, "To Serve, To Strive and not To Yield," from the poem "Ulysses" by Alfred Lord Tennyson:
... Come, my friends.
Tis not too late to seek a newer world.
Though much is taken, much abides; and though
We are not now that strength which in old days
Moved earth and heaven, that which we are, we are --
One equal temper of heroic hearts,
Made weak by time and fate, but strong in will
To strive, to seek, to find, and not to yield.

Current
Since its founding in the middle of the last century, Outward Bound has encouraged individuals to test their physical and emotional limits in challenging outdoor adventure programs.  The experiences are a means of building inner strength and a heightened awareness of human interdependence. Outward Bound operates more than 35 schools in various countries and reports serving over 250,000 students each year. Outward Bound's compass rose emblem serves as the logo for almost all the schools around the world.

Course specifics 

Outward Bound courses follow a kind of recipe or formula, termed the Outward Bound Process Model which is well described by Walsh and Golins (1976) as:

 Taking a ready, motivated learner
 into a prescribed, unfamiliar physical environment,
 along with a small group of people
 who are faced with a series of incremental, inter-related problem-solving tasks
 which creates in the individual a state of dissonance requiring adaptive coping and
 leads to a sense of mastery or competence when equilibrium is managed.
 The cumulative effect of these experiences leads to a reorganisation of the self-conceptions and information the learner holds about him/herself.
 The learner will then continue to be positively oriented to further learning and development experiences (transfer).

In a typical class, participants are divided into small patrols (or groups) under the guidance of one or more instructors. The first few days, often at a base camp, are spent training for the outdoor education activities that the course will contain and in the philosophy of Outward Bound. After initial confidence-building challenges, the group heads off on an expedition. As the group develops the capacity to do so, the instructors ask the group to make its own decisions.

See also
Adventure education
Experiential education
Experiential learning
Lack of physical education
 Outward Bound Australia
 Outward Bound Costa Rica
Outward Bound Hong Kong
 Outward Bound New Zealand
 Outward Bound Singapore
 Outward Bound USA

References

External links
The Outward Bound Trust, official website for the United Kingdom
, Outward Bound International

 
Educational charities based in the United Kingdom
Organisations based in Highland (council area)
Outdoor education organizations
1941 establishments in the United Kingdom
Organizations established in 1941
Physical education in the United Kingdom